is a Japanese manga series written and illustrated by Katsuhisa Minami. It was serialized in Kodansha's seinen manga magazine Weekly Young Magazine from November 2014 to November 2019, with its chapters collected in 22 tankōbon volumes. A sequel series, titled The Fable: The Second Contact started in Weekly Young Magazine in July 2021.

A live-action film adaptation premiered in Japan in June 2019 and a sequel premiered in June 2021.

As of October 2022, the manga had over 20 million copies in circulation, making it one of the best-selling manga series. In 2017, The Fable won the 41st Kodansha Manga Award for the General category.

Plot
Equipped with his favorite weapon, an anthracite-colored Nighthawk pistol, "Fable" is a professional killer feared by all the Japanese underworld, politicians, mobsters and public figures. This assassination genius can send any of his targets six feet under and in six seconds, if his heart tells him. One day, his sponsor orders him to put everything on hold and lead the life of an ordinary citizen, in the hideout of a yakuza clan in Osaka, ban on killing or attacking anyone for an entire year. For this human weapon with an unpredictable temperament, surrounded by trigger-happy criminals, the hardest contract begins.

Media

Manga
The series ran in Kodansha's seinen manga magazine Weekly Young Magazine from November 1, 2014 to November 18, 2019. Kodansha collected its chapters in twenty-two tankōbon volumes, released from March 6, 2015 to June 5, 2020.

A sequel, titled , started in Weekly Young Magazine on July 19, 2021. Its first volume was released on November 5, 2021.

A spin-off, also titled The Fable, but written in hiragana (ざ・ふぁぶる) instead of katakana, was published on Comic Days online platform from March 6, 2018 to February 26, 2019. A collected tankōbon, which also includes other stories by Minami, was published on June 5, 2020.

In March 2022, Kodansha USA announced they licensed the series for English publication.

Volume list

The Fable: The Second Contact

Live-action films
A live-action film adaptation directed by Kan Eguchi premiered in Japan on June 21, 2019. The film stars Junichi Okada as Fable.

A sequel film, titled , was originally announced to premiere on February 5, 2021, however, in January 2021, it was announced that it would be postponed due to the COVID-19 pandemic, and it premiered on June 18, 2021.

Reception
The Fable won the 41st Kodansha Manga Award for the General category in 2017. Alongside Blue Period, the series ranked #14 on Takarajimasha's Kono Manga ga Sugoi! list of best manga of 2020 for male readers.

As of January 2021, the manga had 8 million copies in circulation. As of March 2022, the manga had 15 million copies in circulation. As of October 2022, the manga had over 20 million copies in circulation.

References

External links
 
 

Drama anime and manga
Kodansha franchises
Kodansha manga
Seinen manga
Thriller anime and manga
Winner of Kodansha Manga Award (General)
Japanese thriller drama films